is a Japanese manufacturer of electronic musical instruments, electronic equipment, and software. It was founded by Ikutaro Kakehashi in Osaka on 18 April 1972. In 2005, its headquarters relocated to Hamamatsu in Shizuoka Prefecture. It has factories in Malaysia, Taiwan, Japan, and the United States. As of 31 March 2010, it employed 2,699 people. In 2014, it was subject to a management buyout by its CEO, Junichi Miki, supported by Taiyo Pacific Partners.

Roland has manufactured numerous instruments that have had lasting impacts on music, such as the Juno-106 synthesizer, TB-303 bass synthesizer, and TR-808 and TR-909 drum machines. It was also instrumental in the development of MIDI, a standardized means of synchronizing electronic instruments manufactured by different companies. In 2016, Fact wrote that Roland had arguably had more influence on electronic music than any other company.

History

1970s 
Having created Ace Electronic Industries Inc in 1960, Ikutaro Kakehashi founded Roland in Osaka on April 18, 1972. While rival companies Moog and ARP targeted professional musicians and academics, Kakehashi, who had no musical training, wanted to appeal to amateurs and hobbyists, and focused on miniaturization, affordability, and simplicity.

The "Roland" name was selected for export purposes, as Kakehashi was interested in a name that was easy to pronounce for his worldwide target markets. The name was found in a telephone directory, and Kakehashi was satisfied with the simple two-syllable word and its soft consonants. The letter "R" was chosen because it was not used by many other music equipment companies,  so would stand out in trade-show directories and industry listings. Kakehashi did not learn of the French epic poem The Song of Roland until later.

With seven employees from his former company, a rented shed, and $100,000, Kakehashi built on his experience at Ace, introducing a drum machine, the TR-77 or Rhythm 77, as Roland's first product, followed by the TR-33 and TR-55 released that same year. In 1973, Roland introduced the first compact synthesizer produced in Japan and the first synthesizer produced by Roland, the SH-1000, as well as their first nonpreset synthesizer, the SH-3.

The company was also manufacturing effects pedals, introducing the RE-201 Space Echo in 1974, and expanding into guitar amplifiers the following year with the JC-60 and JC-120 Jazz Chorus, whose chorus circuit would become the first Boss Corporation product, the CE-1 Chorus Ensemble, the following year. In 1976, Roland introduced the semimodular System 100 and the modular System 700 synthesizers.

In 1977, the company introduced one of the earliest microprocessor-driven music sequencers, the MC-8 MicroComposer, and the first guitar synthesizer, the GR-500. Just one year later, they introduced the CompuRhythm CR-78, the first drum machine that enabled users to program and store their own drum patterns.

1980s 
During the 1980s and 1990s, Roland released several instruments that have had a lasting influence on popular music. After Kakehashi realized microprocessors could be used to program drum machines, Roland launched the TR-808 drum machine, its first programmable drum machine, in 1980. Although it was not an immediate commercial success, the 808 was eventually used on more hit records than any other drum machine and became a cornerstone of the emerging electronic and hip hop genres. It has been described as hip hop's equivalent to the Fender Stratocaster guitar, which dramatically influenced the development of rock music. The 808 was followed in 1983 by the TR-909, which, alongside the TB-303 synthesizer, influenced the development of dance music such as techno, house, and acid. Roland released the Roland Jupiter-8 in 1981.

Roland played a key role in the development of MIDI, a standardized means of synchronizing electronic musical instruments manufactured by different companies. Kakehashi proposed developing a standard with representatives from Oberheim Electronics, Sequential Circuits, Yamaha, Korg, and Kawai. He and Dave Smith of Sequential Circuits unveiled MIDI in 1983. It remains the industry standard.

1990s 

In, 1991 Roland released the JD-800, a digital synthesizer with many sliders. In 1993, they released the JD-990, which is the rackmount version of the JD-800. In 1994, Kakehashi founded the Roland Foundation and became chairman. In 1995, he was appointed the chairman of Roland Corporation.
Roland instruments were also featured in the "There Goes A . . . " series of videos by Dave Hood.

2000s 
In 2001, Kakehashi resigned from the position and was appointed as special executive adviser of Roland Corporation. In 2002, he published an autobiography, I Believe in Music. His second book, An Age Without Samples: Originality and Creativity in the Digital World, was published in 2017.

2010s 
In 2018, Roland launched a subscription service called Roland Cloud. Users of the service can download and emulate a number of Roland synthesizers (modelled through a proprietary paradigm called ACB) and drum machines in audio plugin formats. This collection also includes orchestral modules (namely the Roland SRX racks) and new additions such as original sampled instruments.

2020s 
Throughout 2022, Roland celebrated their 50th anniversary by releasing two new editions of their Space Echo tape delay through their Boss brand, along with selling commemorative merchandise and clothing through their online streetswear shop Roland Lifestyle. Later on, a collaboration with Dais Records was announced on June 8th ahead of the release of the JUNO-X synthesizer the following month. A new Jupiter-4 emulation for Roland Cloud and an NFT collection also materialised in the summer and autumn respectively.

Brands
Roland markets products under a number of brand names, each of which is used on products geared toward a different niche.

 The Roland brand is used on a wide range of products including synthesizers, digital pianos, electronically enhanced accordions, electronic drum systems, dance and DJ gear, guitar synthesizers, amplifiers, and recording products. Many of these products are now also available through Roland Cloud, a VST subscription service.
 Boss is a brand used for products geared toward guitar players, and is used for guitar pedals, effects units, rhythm and accompaniment machines, guitar amplifiers, and portable recording equipment.
 Edirol was a line of professional video-editing and video-presentation systems, as well as portable digital audio recorders. Edirol also had Desktop Media (DTM) products, more production-oriented, and included computer audio interfaces, mixers, and speakers. Following Roland's purchase of a controlling interest in Cakewalk Software, most of the division's products were rebranded as Cakewalk products or blended with the professional audio/RSS products to form Roland Systems Group. 
 Roland Systems Group is a line of professional commercial audio and video products.
 Amdek was incorporated in 1981 "as a manufacturer of computerized music peripherals and as a distributor of assembled electronic music instrument parts." The Amdek brand is best remembered for a series of user-assembled effects pedals and accessories, marketed until 1983; at least 16 kits are known to have existed. Amdek's primary focus was on the potential uses of personal computers to assist musicians, and in 1982 they introduced the DXY-100, the company's first pen plotter, with the intent of allowing users to print out their own sheet music. Soon realizing the printer had a much larger market potential, in 1983 Amdek became the Roland DG Corporation.
 Roland DG produces computerized vinyl cutters, thermal-transfer printer/cutters, wide-format inkjet printers and printer/cutters, 3D scanners, and dental milling devices, and engravers.
 At one point, Roland acquired the then-defunct Rhodes name, and released a number of digital keyboards bearing the Rhodes brand. Harold Rhodes had regained the rights to the name in 2000 prior to his death that same year. Rhodes was dissatisfied with Roland's treatment of the marque, and had plans to reintroduce his iconic electric piano, but died before he was able to bring it to market.
 V-MODA designs and develops "world‑class high‑fidelity headphones and audio devices" and became a part of the Roland family on 8 August 2016 also known as 808 Day.

References

Further reading

External links

 Official Roland website

Companies listed on the Tokyo Stock Exchange
Guitar manufacturing companies
Guitar amplifier manufacturers
Percussion instrument manufacturing companies
Synthesizer manufacturing companies of Japan

Manufacturers of professional audio equipment
Japanese brands
Companies based in Shizuoka Prefecture
Electronics companies established in 1972
Japanese companies established in 1972
Audio mixing console manufacturers
Musical instrument manufacturing companies of Japan
Audio equipment manufacturers of Japan
Hamamatsu